Steven John Raica (born November 8, 1952) is an American prelate of the Roman Catholic Church. He has been serving as bishop of the Diocese of Birmingham in Alabama since 2020.  He previously served as bishop of the Diocese of Gaylord in Michigan from 2014 to 2020

Biography

Early life and education
Steven Raica was born on November 8, 1952, in Munising, Michigan to Steve and Mary Raica.  He earned a bachelor's degree from Michigan State University in East Lansing, Michigan, a Master of Divinity degree from St. John's Provincial Seminary in Plymouth, Michigan, and a Master of Religious Studies degree from the University of Detroit.

Ordination and ministry
Raica was ordained a priest for the Diocese of Lansing by Bishop Kenneth Povish on October 14, 1978.After his ordination, Raica served as the parochial vicar at two parishes between 1978 and 1984: Holy Redeemer in Burton, Michigan and St. Pius X in Flint, Michigan. He served as pastor of Holy Family Parish in Ovid, Michigan from 1984 to 1985 and as co-rector of St. Mary Cathedral from 1985 to 1988. Raica earned a licentiate and a doctorate in canon law from the Pontifical Gregorian University in Rome.  

After his return to Michigan in 1991, Raica became the pastor of St. Mary Parish in Charlotte, Michigan, serving there until 1993.  He became pastor of St. Ann Parish in Bellevue, Michigan from 1995 to 1997. From 1997 to 1999 and from 2005 to 2014 Raica served as chancellor of the diocese. Pope John Paul II named him an honorary prelate of his holiness, with the title monsignor, in 1998. 

Raica served as superior of Casa Santa Maria, the graduate studies house of the Pontifical North American College in Rome, from 1999 to 2005.  At the same time, he served as a spiritual director and adjunct faculty at the college. In addition, Raica served the diocese tribunal as a pro-synodal judge, the promoter of justice and a tribunal judge. He was also involved in ministry to the deaf and is fluent in American Sign Language.  Raica can converse in Italian and Polish, and has a reading knowledge of Latin, French, Spanish and German.

Bishop of Gaylord

On June 27, 2014, Pope Francis appointed Raica as the fifth bishop of the Diocese Gaylord. He was consecrated by Archbishop Allen Vigneron on August 28, 2014, in St. Mary, Our Lady of Mount Carmel Cathedral in Gaylord, Michigan. Bishop Emeritus Carl Mengeling and Coadjutor Archbishop Bernard Hebda were the principal co-consecrators.

Bishop of Birmingham
Francis named Raica as bishop of the Diocese of Birmingham on March 25, 2020. He was installed on June 23, 2020.

See also

 Catholic Church hierarchy
 Catholic Church in the United States
 Historical list of the Catholic bishops of the United States
 List of Catholic bishops of the United States
 Lists of patriarchs, archbishops, and bishops

References

External links
 Roman Catholic Diocese of Birmingham Official Site
Roman Catholic Diocese of Gaylord Official Site

 

1952 births
Living people
People from Munising, Michigan
Michigan State University alumni
University of Detroit Mercy alumni
Pontifical North American College alumni
Pontifical Gregorian University alumni
21st-century Roman Catholic bishops in the United States
Roman Catholic Diocese of Lansing
Roman Catholic bishops of Gaylord
Bishops appointed by Pope Francis